The 2019 Korea National League Championship was the 16th and the last competition of the Korea National League Championship. This competition was abolished after Korea National League teams joined the K3 League in 2020.

Group stage

Group A

Group B

Knockout stage

Bracket

Semi-finals

Final

See also
2019 in South Korean football
2019 Korea National League

References

External links

Korea National League Championship seasons
K
May 2019 sports events in South Korea
June 2019 sports events in South Korea